Vince McNally (December 5, 1902 – December 4, 1997) was an American football executive who served as the general manager of the Philadelphia Eagles from 1949 to 1964.

He died on December 4, 1997, in Berwyn, Pennsylvania at age 94.

References

1902 births
1997 deaths
American football quarterbacks
Holy Cross Crusaders football coaches
Notre Dame Fighting Irish football players
Notre Dame Fighting Irish men's basketball players
National Football League general managers
Philadelphia Eagles executives
Saint Mary's Gaels football coaches
Saint Mary's Gaels men's basketball coaches
Villanova Wildcats football coaches
Players of American football from Philadelphia
American men's basketball players
Basketball coaches from Pennsylvania
Basketball players from Philadelphia
Sportspeople from Philadelphia